Tamara Hickey is a Canadian film and television actress.

Early life and education 
Born in Halifax, Nova Scotia, she was raised primarily in Charlottetown, Prince Edward Island. She studied at Ryerson University and the Royal Academy of Dramatic Art.

Career 
Hickey began her career with small roles in television films and was an understudy for a Toronto production of Beauty and the Beast, before getting her first lead role in The Associates. Following the cancellation of The Associates, she was cast in Blue Murder as the new lead detective after Maria del Mar left the series. After completing filming on Blue Murder, she starred in a production of John Krizanc's play Tamara for Toronto's Necessary Angel Theatre.

She has also had guest roles in Doc, Puppets Who Kill, This Is Wonderland, One Life to Live, Rent-a-Goalie and Army Wives, and appeared in the television miniseries Olive Kitteridge and The Secret Life of Marilyn Monroe and the films It All Happens Incredibly Fast, Against the Ropes, In Your Eyes, The Judge, Irrational Man, We Don't Belong Here and The Equalizer 2.

Filmography

Film

Television

References

External links

Canadian film actresses
Canadian television actresses
Canadian stage actresses
Actresses from Halifax, Nova Scotia
Actresses from Prince Edward Island
People from Charlottetown
Living people
Alumni of RADA
Toronto Metropolitan University alumni
Year of birth missing (living people)